During the 1989–90 English football season, Everton F.C. competed in the Football League First Division. They finished 6th in the table with 59 points. The Toffees also advanced to the 5th round of the FA Cup and the 4th round of the League Cup.

Final league table

Results
Everton's score comes first

Legend

Football League First Division

FA Cup

League Cup

Squad

References

Everton F.C. seasons
Everton
Everton F.C. season